Alberto Moreno (born 2 May 1950) is a Cuban diver. He competed in two events at the 1968 Summer Olympics.

References

1950 births
Living people
Cuban male divers
Olympic divers of Cuba
Divers at the 1968 Summer Olympics
Sportspeople from Havana
20th-century Cuban people